Facundo Adrián Erpen Bariffo (born May 19, 1983 in Gualeguaychú) is an Argentine footballer.

Career

Early career in Argentina
Erpen was part of the Boca Juniors youth system and played for Club Juventud Unida and Talleres de Córdoba before signing with D.C. United in the summer of 2005.

United States
Erpen made 40 appearances for D.C. United, scoring 4 goals, and took part in the 2006 MLS All Star game, against FA Premier League champions Chelsea after being called up as a replacement for injured Eddie Pope.

Erpen was traded to the Colorado Rapids for Greg Vanney in June 2007, and played for two seasons for the Denver team before being released January 2009.

He was signed by USL First Division side Miami FC in April 2009, but was waived after having just played five games for the team.

Honors

D.C. United
 Major League Soccer Supporter's Shield: 2006, 2007

Puebla
 Copa MX: Clausura 2015

References

External links
 
 
 
 

1983 births
Living people
Argentine footballers
Argentine expatriate footballers
Association football defenders
Sportspeople from Entre Ríos Province
Argentine people of German descent
Boca Juniors footballers
Talleres de Córdoba footballers
D.C. United players
Colorado Rapids players
Miami FC (2006) players
Instituto footballers
Atlas F.C. footballers
Club Puebla players
Atlético Morelia players
San Martín de San Juan footballers
Major League Soccer players
Major League Soccer All-Stars
USL First Division players
Liga MX players
Argentine Primera División players
Primera Nacional players
Argentine expatriate sportspeople in Mexico
Argentine expatriate sportspeople in the United States
Expatriate footballers in Mexico
Expatriate soccer players in the United States